SASB may refer to:

 South Akcakoca Sub-Basin gas field
 Sustainability Accounting Standards Board

